Melvin James McQuaid (6 September 1911 – 16 January 2001) was a Progressive Conservative party member of the House of Commons of Canada. He was born in Souris, Prince Edward Island and became a lawyer and clerk by career.

McQuaid attended Saint Dunstan's University, St. Francis Xavier University and Dalhousie Law School.

In 1957, he became town clerk for Souris. He served in provincial politics as a Councillor of the Legislative Assembly of Prince Edward Island for 1st Kings District from 1959 to 1962, including functions as provincial treasurer and Attorney General.

He was first elected at the King's riding in the 1965 general election, and re-elected at the Cardigan riding in the 1968 election.

After serving his terms in the 27th and 28th Canadian Parliaments, McQuaid returned to provincial politics to become leader of the provincial Progressive Conservative party which was the Opposition party. He once again became a Councillor for the 1st Kings electoral district from 1972 until 1976. After leaving provincial office, McQuaid was appointed a judge of the Supreme Court of Prince Edward Island. After his retirement from the court in 1981, he served on the National Parole Board.

Electoral record

References

External links
 

1911 births
2001 deaths
Lawyers in Prince Edward Island
Justices of the Supreme Court of Prince Edward Island
Members of the Executive Council of Prince Edward Island
Members of the House of Commons of Canada from Prince Edward Island
Progressive Conservative Party of Prince Edward Island MLAs
Progressive Conservative Party of Canada MPs
Saint Dunstan's University alumni
St. Francis Xavier University alumni
Schulich School of Law alumni
Progressive Conservative Party of Prince Edward Island leaders
People from Souris, Prince Edward Island